Anneka Reardon (born 4 September 1997) is an Australian representative lightweight rower. She is a four time Australian national champion and has represented at senior World Championships.

Club and state rowing
Reardon was raised in Tasmania and first coached in sculling by her father Mick. Her senior club rowing was from the Lindisfarne Rowing Club and the Sandy Bay Rowing Club in Hobart. After making Australian representative squads she has rowed from the Australian National University Boat Club

She first made state selection for Tasmania in the 2017 women's youth eight which contested the Bicentennial Cup at the Interstate Regatta within the Australian Rowing Championships. In 2019 she moved into the Tasmanian women's lightweight quad scull which contested and won the Victoria Cup at the Interstate Regatta. She represented again in successful Tasmanian Victoria Cup quads in 2021 & 2022.

In 2021 in ANU colours she won the open lightweight women's quad scull title at the Australian Rowing Championships and placed third in the open lightweight single scull.

International representative rowing
In March 2022 Reardon was selected in the Australian senior training team to prepare for the 2022 international season and the 2022 World Rowing Championships. She rowed Australia's lightweight double scull with Lucy Coleman at the World Rowing Cup II in June 2022 to a silver medal. At the 2022 World Rowing Championships at Racize, she again raced the lightweight double with Coleman.  They finished fourth in the B final for an overall tenth place finish at the regatta.

References

External links
Reardon at World Rowing

1997 births
Living people
Australian female rowers
People from Tasmania
21st-century Australian women